Phenylacetone  is an organic compound with the chemical formula C6H5CH2COCH3. It is a colorless oil that is soluble in organic solvents. This substance is used in the manufacture of methamphetamine and amphetamine, where it is commonly known as P2P. Due to the illicit uses in clandestine chemistry, it was declared a schedule II controlled substance in the United States in 1980. In humans, phenylacetone occurs as a metabolite of amphetamine and methamphetamine via FMO3-mediated oxidative deamination.

Synthesis
One synthesis of phenylacetone starts with phenylacetic acid:

Sodium acetate or pyridine have been employed int his reaction.

Phenylacetone can also be prepared by reaction of chloroacetone with benzene in the presence of aluminum chloride catalyst.

Amphetamine metabolism

In popular culture
In the TV series Breaking Bad, Walter White manufactures methamphetamine through an enantioselective variation of the P2P method, starting from phenylacetone.

See also
 MDP2P – related compound with a methylenedioxy group, and a precursor to MDMA.
 Cyclohexylacetone – the cyclohexane derivative of phenylacetone
 Phenylacetones
 Methamphetamine

Notes

Reference notes

References

Amphetamine
Ketones
Phenyl compounds
Benzyl compounds